Courtomer is the name of two communes in France:

 Courtomer, Orne, in the Orne department
 Courtomer, Seine-et-Marne, in the Seine-et-Marne department